Scott Linklater (born 25 February 1979) is a former New Zealand rugby union player and New Zealand Māori All Black. A hooker, Linklater played for Bristol in the Guinness Premiership.

Prior to joining Bristol, Linklater played for the Chiefs in the Super 14 and the Waikato provincial side.

He is now a regional and Māori Relationship manager for Community Leisure Management (CLM).

References

External links
Bristol Rugby profile
All Blacks profile

1979 births
Living people
Bristol Bears players
Māori All Blacks players
People educated at Kamo High School
Rugby union hookers